Wong Yuk Lun (born July 19, 1987), better known by his ring name Ho Ho Lun (Hoholun, 何顥麟), is a Hong Kong professional wrestler. He is best known for his time with WWE, where he competed in their Cruiserweight Classic tournament and in their developmental territory NXT. He is the founder of the Hong Kong Pro-Wrestling Federation, Hong Kong's first professional wrestling promotion. Ho has also competed in various independent promotions in Japan, mainland China, Taiwan, Singapore, and Europe. In Chinese surname order, his surname is actually Ho but in English world some people misunderstood his surname as Lun.

Professional wrestling career

Early career
After being influenced by the stars of the World Wrestling Federation and New Japan Pro-Wrestling, Lun decided to pursue a career as a professional wrestler. His professional wrestling career began in 2007, when he started training with the Guangzhou, China-based China Wrestling Entertainment (CWE) promotion.

Hong Kong Pro-Wrestling Federation (HKWF) (2009–present)
After travelling back and forth from Guangzhou to Hong Kong every week for two years, Ho decided to open a wrestling gym of his own in his homeland of Hong Kong. He founded Hong Kong Pro-Wrestling Federation and launched its gym in Shatin, Hong Kong, where he and other Hong Kong wrestlers had been training. Notable wrestlers from the gym include Jason Lee, Ladybeard, and Bit Man. The group had their first show on June 6, 2009, this event served as a starting point for the sport of professional wrestling in Hong Kong. In 2012, Lun challenged Jason Lee for the AWGC Junior Heavyweight Championship but fell short. In 2015, he formed a new stable call Outer Space with fellow Hong Kong wrestlers Jeff Man, Kevin Man, Ham Sap Chan and Beijing wrestler Gao Yuan. On 26 June 2016, a few days after he debut for the WWE Cruiserweight Classic, he defeated Jason Lee to become Hong Kong's AWGC Jr Heavyweight Champion. On December 31, 2016, he defeated M.A. in Dongguan, China for his first championship defense. However, on January 8, 2017, he failed on his second defense of his championship in Hong Kong and was defeated by Dai Ten Z.

Asian independent circuit (2010–present)
Ho Ho Lun's first match outside Hong Kong took place for Taiwan Wrestling Taipei (TWT) at an event held in Taiwan in 2010. Since 2010, Lun has wrestled for many other companies in Taiwan including Impact Wrestling Love (IWL) and New Taiwan Wrestling (NTW). Lun has challenged for the NTW Tag Team Championship on multiple occasions. In 2014 and 2015, Ho Ho Lun toured in Chongqing, China for Crazy League Pro Wrestling. He is also a regular roster member of Mainland China based wrestling companies China Wrestling Entertainment (CWE) and Middle Kingdom Wrestling (MKW). Ho Ho Lun has also been wrestling in Singapore since 2012 and makes regular appearances for Singapore Pro Wrestling's City Asia sub-brand. In August 2017, he worked with a casino complex in Macau and established Macau Wrestling Association (MWA). Alongside with a number of Hong Kong wrestlers, the MWA also had a team of Mexican wrestlers. He wrestled in shows everyday until the MWA decided to fold up in January 2018. On 17th March 2018, he defeated Sam Gradwell, Buffa and Gao Yuan in a 4-way match to become the first ever Guangzhou-based wrestling promotion King of Pro Wrestling (KOPW) Champion. In early 2019, he is appointed as the producer for Extreme Wrestling Entertainment (EWE) in Macau. They held a one-off show in Broadway Theater in Macau which feature a number of Japanese, American and Chinese talents. In the same year, he start wrestling for Manila Wrestling Federation in the Philippines where he become a regular roster. On 27 July 2019, he defeated Robin Sane to become MWF Champion. Ho Ho Lun wrestled for Singaporean promotion, Ring of Rebirth, teaming with Big T, however losing to the duo of Erfie and DJ Kal, in August of 2022.

European independent circuit (2010–2013, 2015, 2019)
Ho Ho Lun first traveled to the United Kingdom in 2010, training with the 4 Front Wrestling promotion. In 2011, he traveled to the UK for a second time, this time staying in the nation for six months. During his 2011 tour in the UK, Lun wrestled for 4FW, Triple X Wrestling (TXW), Pro Wrestling Live (PWL) and other independent promotions. The most notable match of his 2011 tour was a BWE Championship match in Essex. In 2013, Ho Ho Lun return to the UK again and wrestled in a various promotions, including Attack Pro Wrestling and Fight Club Pro. During his 2013 European trip, Lun also wrestled in Spain and Portugal. In 2015, Lun returned to Europe for a short two week tour, wrestling in Portugal and in England for Pro Wrestling Pride where he would challenge for the PWP Catch Division Championship in a fatal-4-way. In Summer 2019, he returned to the UK for a short tour of two months where he wrestled for a number of promotions including Southside Pro Wrestling, NORTH Pro Wrestling and Futureshock Pro Wrestling.

Japanese promotions (2012–2016)
Ho Ho Lun's first match at a Japanese wrestling event occurred in 2012, when he participated in the Pro Wrestling Zero1 (Zero1) Tenkaichi Jr Tournament. Lun was eliminated in the first round by Irish wrestler Sean Guinness. Lun returned to Zero1 in 2014, where he wrestled primarily on the promotion's events held in North-Eastern Japan. During his 2014 Japanese tour, Lun would also wrestle for longtime Japanese independent group Michinoku Pro Wrestling. In 2016, Lun returned to Japan for the first time in two years, wrestling in Yokohama for Land's End Pro Wrestling.

WWE (2016–2017)
Ho Ho Lun was a participant in the 2016 WWE Cruiserweight Classic tournament. The tournament began on June 23 with Lun defeating Ariya Daivari in his first round match. On July 14, Lun was eliminated from the tournament by Noam Dar.

On October 2, Lun was announced for NXT's 2016 Dusty Rhodes Tag Team Classic, teaming with Tian Bing. Lun and Bing were eliminated from the tournament by Johnny Gargano and Tommaso Ciampa. On November 2, Lun was announced as a roster member for the cruiserweight-centric 205 Live show. 

Lun made an appearance on the March 8, 2017, episode of NXT, in a losing effort against Andrade "Cien" Almas. On the June 28 episode of NXT, Lun was defeated by The Velveteen Dream, which would be his final appearance for WWE. On August 3, WWE announced that Lun had requested and was granted his release from his WWE contract, to care for his ailing mother.

Dragon Gate Pro Wrestling (2018–present) 
Ho Ho Lun first participation with Dragon Gate Pro Wrestling was in 2018 where Dragon Gate ran their first ever Hong Kong event. He was a regular roster for their Hong Kong tour. In October 2019, he toured for Dragon Gate Japan for the first time. He wrestled for opening matches in most of the shows. Starting from August 2020, along with Jae Church, Ho Ho Lun become part of the English commentator team for Dragon Gate Network. On 16th December 2020, Ho Ho Lun defeated Punch Tominaga to score his first single match victory in Dragon Gate.

Championships and accomplishments
 King of Pro-Wrestling
 KOPW Championship  (1 time)
 Pro Wrestling Illustrated
 PWI ranked him #409 of the top 500 singles wrestlers in the PWI 500 in 2017
 Zero1 Hong Kong
 AWGC Junior Heavyweight Championship  (1 time)
 Manila Wrestling Federation 
 MWF Champion (current)

References

External links
WWE.com profile

1987 births
Living people
Hong Kong male professional wrestlers